Sandoz was a company that merged with Ciba-Geigy to form Novartis. The name was later reused as the name of Novartis' generic drug subsidiary.

Sandoz may also refer to:
 Sandoz (surname)
 Sandoz (band), a recording alias of musician Richard H. Kirk

Other 
 "Sandoz in the Rain" (1970), a song by Amon Düül II from their album Yeti
Sandoz (watch company) (late 19th century), a Swiss watch brand established by Henri Sandoz